Tulane Studies in Philosophy was a peer-reviewed academic journal, formerly published by the philosophy department at Tulane University in New Orleans. The journal published original articles by invited contributors and members of the Tulane philosophy department. Notable contributors included Lewis S. Ford, Charles Hartshorne, John Lachs, Andrew Reck, and Sandra B. Rosenthal. Established in 1952, the journal was published annually until 1987. All volumes are available online from the Philosophy Documentation Center.

Indexing 
Tulane Studies in Philosophy has been abstracted and indexed in Periodicals Index Online, The Philosopher's Index, Philosophy Research Index, and PhilPapers.

See also 
 List of philosophy journals

References

External links 
 

Philosophy journals
Annual journals
Publications established in 1952
Publications disestablished in 1987
Tulane University
English-language journals
Philosophy Documentation Center academic journals